Alberto Vecchio is a physicist, professor at University of Birmingham in the School of Physics and Astronomy, and the Director of the Institute of Gravitational Wave Astronomy. He was a contributor in the upgrade of LIGO to Advanced LIGO which resulted in the discovery of gravitational waves in February 2016.

Education
He graduated with a degree in theoretical physics as an undergraduate (Laurea) at Ghislieri College and the University of Pavia, he then obtained a PhD in astronomy from the University of Milan in 1996, where he worked with Bruno Bertotti, one of Erwin Schrödinger's last students.

LIGO
Working in collaboration with other scientists at University of Birmingham, he helped build and test instruments to detect gravitational waves. After these were improved further as part of the Advanced LIGO upgrade, gravitational waves were detected. These instruments allowed the properties of the sources from the gravitational wave signatures to be extracted.

References

Academics of the University of Birmingham
Gravitational-wave astronomy
21st-century Italian physicists
Living people
Year of birth missing (living people)